The Pungwe chiselmouth (Labeobarbus pungweensis) is a species of ray-finned fish in the genus Labeobarbus is found in the Pungwe River and Buzi River in Zimbabwe and Mozambique, and the Ruo River in Malawi.

References 

pungweensis
Fish described in 1959
Fauna of the Eastern Highlands